"Flavor of the Month" is a 1993 song by the Posies.

Flavor of the Month may also refer to:
"Flavor of the Month", a 1991 song by Black Sheep from A Wolf in Sheep's Clothing
"The Flavor of the Month", a 2013 song by Poisonblack from Lyijy
Flavor of the Month, a 1994 novel by Olivia Goldsmith
Flavor of the Month, a 2003 novel by Tori Carrington
Flavor of the Month, a 1990 Philippine film starring Lito Pimentel

See also
 "Flavor of the Weak", a song by American Hi-Fi